Nototriton saslaya is a species of salamander in the family Plethodontidae. It is endemic to Nicaragua. This species is known only from Cerro Sasalya and Cerro El Torro in Parque Nacional Saslaya, north-central Nicaragua.

Its natural habitats are lower montane wet (cloud) forests. It is an arboreal species hiding in thick moss.

References

Nototriton
Endemic fauna of Nicaragua
Amphibians of Nicaragua
Amphibians described in 2002
Taxonomy articles created by Polbot